Metabus is a mythical king of the Volsci.

Metabus may also refer to:

 Metabus (spider) is a spider genus
 Metapontum, in Italy